Dimofte is a Romanian surname. Notable people with the surname include:

Ionuț Dimofte (born 1984), Romanian rugby union footballer
Petrica Dimofte, Romanian sprint canoer

Romanian-language surnames